Peddapalli is a town in the Indian state of Telangana.

Peddapalle or Peddapalli or Peddapally or variation, may also refer to:
 Peddapalli (Lok Sabha constituency), national constituency of the parliament of India
 Peddapalli district, a district in the Indian state of Telangana
 Peddapalli Junction railway station
 Peddapalle (Assembly constituency), state constituency of the parliament of Telangana